McNabb's is an unincorporated community in Alberta, Canada within Athabasca County that is recognized as a designated place by Statistics Canada.

As defined by Statistics Canada, McNabb's is adjacent to the western boundary of the designated place of Colinton. However, Athabasca County recognizes McNabb's as being part of the Hamlet of Colinton.

Demographics 

As a designated place in the 2011 Census, McNabb's had a population of 59 living in 24 of its 25 total dwellings, a -9.2% change from its 2006 population of 65.

See also 
List of communities in Alberta

References 

Former designated places in Alberta
Localities in Athabasca County